Larry Dobie Woods (born May 11, 1948) is a former professional American football player who played in six NFL seasons from 1971–1976 for the four teams.

1948 births
Living people
Sportspeople from Florence, Alabama
American football defensive tackles
Tennessee State Tigers football players
Detroit Lions players
Miami Dolphins players
New York Jets players
Seattle Seahawks players
People from Rogersville, Alabama